Trachelus is a genus of sawflies belonging to the family Cephidae.

Species:
 Trachelus flavicornis
 Trachelus libanensis
 Trachelus tabidus

References

Cephidae
Sawfly genera